Olga Kharlampovich (born March 25, 1960 in Sverdlovsk) is a  Russian-Canadian mathematician working in the area of  group theory. She is the Mary P. Dolciani Professor of Mathematics at the CUNY Graduate Center and Hunter College.

Contributions
Kharlampovich is known for her example of a finitely presented 3-step solvable group with unsolvable word problem (solution of the Novikov–Adian problem)  and for the solution together with A. Myasnikov of the Tarski conjecture (from 1945) about equivalence of first order theories of finitely generated non-abelian free groups (also solved by Zlil Sela) and  decidability of this common theory.
 
Algebraic geometry for groups, that  was introduced by Baumslag, Myasnikov, Remeslennikov  and Kharlampovich 

became one of the new research directions in combinatorial group theory.

Education and career
She received her Ph.D.  from the Leningrad State University in 1984 (her doctoral advisor was Lev Shevrin) and Russian “Doctor of Science” in 1990 from the Moscow Steklov Institute.

As of August 2011 she moved to Hunter College of the City University of New York as the Mary P. Dolciani Professor of Mathematics, where she is the inaugural holder of the first endowed professorship in the Department of Mathematics and Statistics.

Recognition
For her undergraduate work on the Novikov–Adian problem she was awarded in 1981 a  Medal from the Soviet Academy of Sciences. She received Ural Mathematical Society Award in 1984 for the solution of the Malcev-Kargapolov problem posed in 1965 about the algorithmic decidability of the universal theory of the class of all finite nilpotent groups.

Kharlampovich was awarded in 1996 the Krieger–Nelson Prize of the CMS for her work on algorithmic problems in varieties of groups and Lie algebras (the description of this work can be found in the survey paper with Sapir and on the prize web site).
She was awarded the 2015 Mal'cev Prize (http://www.ras.ru/about/awards/awdlist.aspx?awdid=64) for the series of works on fundamental model-theoretic problems in algebra.

She was elected a Fellow of the American Mathematical Society in the 2020 class "for  contributions to algorithmic and geometric group theory, algebra and logic."

Selected publications

References

External links 

Hunter webpage
 McGill home page
 

Canadian mathematicians
Women mathematicians
Academic staff of McGill University
City University of New York faculty
Graduate Center, CUNY faculty
Living people
1958 births
Academic staff of Ural State University
Fellows of the American Mathematical Society